Rupprecht is both a surname and a masculine given name, a variant of Robert. People with the name include:

Surname:
Albert Rupprecht (1968), German politician
Anna Rupprecht (1996), German ski jumper
Louis Rupprecht (1925–2000), American speed skater
Philipp Rupprecht (1900–1975), German cartoonist
Tina Rupprecht (1992), German professional boxer
Walter Rupprecht (died 1954), Swiss footballer

Given name:
Rupprecht, Crown Prince of Bavaria (1869–1955), German monarchist
Rupprecht of the Palatinate (disambiguation), several people
Rupprecht Geiger (1908–2009), German abstract painter and sculptor
Rupprecht Gerngroß (1915–1996), German lawyer
Hans Rupprecht Goette (1956), German classical archaeologist

German masculine given names
Surnames from given names